Ricky Brown (born April 1, 1967) is a former professional tennis player from the United States. He is the younger brother of another professional player Jimmy Brown.

Career
Brown was the top ranked American junior for the 16s age division in 1983 and the following year won an Orange Bowl title (18 and under). He and partner Robbie Weiss were boys' doubles champions at the 1984 Wimbledon Championships. They defeated Mark Kratzmann and Jonas Svensson in the final. Brown made his only Grand Slam appearance at the 1984 US Open, where he defeated former Australian Open winner Mark Edmondson in the opening round, before being eliminated in the second round by Henrik Sundström. He won a Challenger doubles title at Winnetka in 1985.

Currently, he is the Tennis Director for The Sports Club of West Bloomfield in Michigan.

ATP Challenger and ITF Futures finals

Doubles: 1 (1–0)

Junior Grand Slam finals

Doubles: 1 (1 title)

References

External links
 
 

1967 births
Living people
American male tennis players
Tennis people from Florida
Wimbledon junior champions
Grand Slam (tennis) champions in boys' doubles